Maria Ruiz may refer to:

María Ruiz (footballer), Spanish footballer
Maria Ruiz (OITNB)
María Ruiz Cruz, Spanish actress
María Ruiz de Burton (1832–1895), Mexican-American writer
María Ruiz (field hockey), Spanish field hockey player
Maria Ruiz Scaperlanda, Christian writer
Teresa Ruiz (politician), born Maria Teresa Ruiz, American politician